The 2013 williamhill.com UK Championship was a professional ranking snooker tournament that took place between 26 November–8 December 2013 at the Barbican Centre in York, England. It was the sixth ranking event of the 2013/2014 season.

Mark Selby made the 100th official maximum break during his semi-final match against Ricky Walden. This was Selby's second official 147 break and the third maximum break in the 2013/2014 season.

Neil Robertson won his ninth ranking title by defeating defending champion Selby 10–7 in the final, despite trailing 1–5 and 3–6 during the match. Robertson became the eighth player to win all Triple Crown events at least once, and the first overseas player to achieve this feat. Selby became the first defending champion to reach the final of the UK Championship since Mark Williams in 2000.

Prize fund
The total prize money of the event was raised to £700,000 from the previous year's £625,000. The breakdown of prize money for this year is shown below:

 Winner: £150,000
 Runner-up: £70,000
 Semi-final: £30,000
 Quarter-final: £20,000
 Last 16: £12,000
 Last 32: £9,000
 Last 64: £3,000

 Highest break: £4,000
 Maximum break: £55,000
 Total: £755,000

Main draw

Top half

Section 1

Section 2

Section 3

Section 4

Bottom half

Section 5

Section 6

Section 7

Section 8

Finals

Final

Century breaks

 147, 130, 129, 116, 109  Mark Selby
 142, 112, 102  Stephen Maguire
 142, 110, 106  Barry Hawkins
 141, 132, 128, 123, 122, 119, 111, 107  Neil Robertson
 139  Michael Leslie
 137  Gary Wilson
 137  Ricky Walden
 136, 101  Dominic Dale
 135, 128, 119  Ding Junhui
 135, 127, 108, 100  Ronnie O'Sullivan
 135, 108  Alfie Burden
 133, 104, 103, 102  Judd Trump
 133  Thanawat Tirapongpaiboon
 131, 131, 124, 107, 101  Stuart Bingham
 131  Mark King
 130, 128, 101  John Higgins
 129  Nigel Bond
 125, 106, 106  Xiao Guodong
 122  Liam Highfield 
 120, 107  Liang Wenbo
 119  Kyren Wilson
 117  Alan McManus
 117  Scott Donaldson
 116, 103  Anthony McGill
 116  Daniel Wells
 113, 112  Mark Allen
 113  Anthony Hamilton
 112, 105  Jamie Burnett
 110  Jamie O'Neill
 110  Joe Perry
 108  Noppon Saengkham
 107, 104, 102  Graeme Dott
 107  Mike Dunn
 107  Jimmy White
 105, 100  Robert Milkins
 105  Michael White
 105  Shaun Murphy
 103, 100  Michael Holt
 102  Yu Delu
 102  Ali Carter
 102  Fergal O'Brien
 101  David Grace
 101  Matthew Stevens
 101  Liu Chuang

References

External links
 2013 WilliamHill.com UK Championship – Pictures by World Snooker at Facebook
 

2013
UK Championship
Championship (snooker)
UK Championship
UK Championship